Pusiola edwardsi is a moth in the subfamily Arctiinae. It was described by Sergius G. Kiriakoff in 1958. It is found in Uganda.

References

Endemic fauna of Uganda
Moths described in 1958
Lithosiini
Moths of Africa